Crash Bandicoot N. Sane Trilogy is a platform video game developed by Vicarious Visions and published by Activision. It is a compilation of remasters of the first three games in the Crash Bandicoot series: Crash Bandicoot (1996), Cortex Strikes Back (1997), and Warped (1998); which were originally developed by Naughty Dog for the PlayStation. Initially released as a timed exclusive for PlayStation 4 in June 2017, it was ported to Nintendo Switch, Windows, and Xbox One in June 2018. It received generally positive reviews from critics and sold over 10 million copies by February 2019.

Gameplay 

Crash Bandicoot N. Sane Trilogy is a collection of remasters of the first three games in the Crash Bandicoot series; Crash Bandicoot, Cortex Strikes Back and Warped. Each game features Crash Bandicoot traversing various levels in order to stop Doctor Neo Cortex from taking over the world. Like in the original games, Crash uses spinning and jumping techniques to defeat enemies, smash crates, and collect items such as Wumpa Fruits, extra lives and protective Aku Aku masks. The trilogy adds new features across all three games, including unified checkpoints, pause menus and save systems, including both manual and automatic saving, time trials, which were first introduced in Warped, and the ability to play most levels in each game as Crash's sister, Coco. It also features remastered audio and cutscenes, including new recordings of the games' dialogue given by the franchise's more recent voice actors.

Development and release 

Prior to the announcement of the N. Sane Trilogy, the Crash Bandicoot franchise had been on hiatus for approximately six years, the last entry being released in 2010. In a Kotaku interview with then-Activision CEO Eric Hirshberg regarding the future of the Crash series, he said, "I don't have anything official to announce, but I can speak as an individual, I love Crash Bandicoot. Those were some of my favorite video games growing up. And I would love to find a way to bring him back, if we could." Andy Gavin, cofounder of Naughty Dog and co-creator of Crash Bandicoot, has said that he would love to see an HD version of the marsupial's first four games, or even a full blown reboot. Fellow co-creator Jason Rubin, said he was hopeful that Activision would "Bring Crash back to their glory days and that the character is still very dear to fans between 18–49 years". In June 2013, Andy Gavin suggested ways to revitalize the series. "Crash needs a total reboot. There's an opportunity to reset the history, and go back to his creation story and the original conflict with Cortex. In that context, you could reprise classic Crash 1 and 2's settings and villains. It would make sense to use a more modern, free-roaming style. I would concentrate on Looney Tunes-esque animation and really addictive action. That's what we did with the original Crash, and there's no reason it couldn't be done today. Given the current Crash games, people forget that he was once cool. Our Crash had a certain whimsical edge to him. Sure, it was goofy – but it wasn't dumb."

In July 2014, Sony Computer Entertainment CEO Andrew House revealed that they had thought about reviving the Crash Bandicoot series, saying "It's never off the table." At E3 2016 during Sony's press conference, Crash Bandicoot made his return when it was announced, in a timed partnership with Activision, that the first three games from the original PlayStation would be remade from the ground up. Crash would also be a playable character in Activision's then-upcoming toys-to-life game Skylanders: Imaginators, released on October 16, 2016. It was announced at Gamescom 2016 that Dr. Neo Cortex would also be playable in Imaginators, and that a Crash-themed level was created for the game, "Thumpin' Wumpa Islands". The remakes of the original trilogy were developed by Vicarious Visions under the title Crash Bandicoot N. Sane Trilogy and were released for PlayStation 4 on June 30, 2017. Vicarious Visions has also expressed interest in making a new Crash Bandicoot game following the N. Sane Trilogy'''s release.

Vicarious Visions coined the term "Remaster Plus" to describe the collection, as they did not fully remake the original games, but rather used Naughty Dog's original level geometry to rebuild the gameplay from scratch. As the levels were coming together, they added their own art, animation, and audio. Almost none of the source codes for the original games were available to the developers, as the game engines were specially written for the original PlayStation and Vicarious Visions could not find a way to use it on more powerful systems. Sony and Naughty Dog were able to provide various polygon meshes from the original, although many important elements from these were missing and the team found that "they were compressed in some wacky format that we had to decode". Vicarious Visions looked at various internet communities to make sure they had essences of the games captured. The team had some fans test the game and give notes about it compared to the originals. In April 2017, there was a contest for fans to submit ideas for idle animations for the character, with the winners announced the following month.

Two additional levels were added as post-launch downloadable content: Stormy Ascent, a level originally designed for the first game but was cut due to its difficulty, and Future Tense, a brand new level created by Vicarious Visions for the third game. After one year of timed exclusivity, the N. Sane Trilogy was ported to Nintendo Switch, Windows, and Xbox One on June 29, 2018; which were developed by Toys for Bob, Iron Galaxy and Vicarious Visions, respectively. The Switch port in particular was not originally intended until a lone engineer at Vicarious Visions successfully ported the game's first level to the platform, proving it was feasible to port the entire trilogy. Sega published the Japanese Switch version on October 18, 2018, while Sony Interactive Entertainment published the Japanese PlayStation 4 version.

 Reception Crash Bandicoot N. Sane Trilogy received "generally favorable" reviews from critics across all platforms on which it was released, according to review aggregator Metacritic. Critics praised multiple aspects, such as the upgraded graphics, unifying gameplay aspects, and overall faithfulness to the originals. Jonathon Dornbush of IGN lauded the graphics as having "the glow of a Saturday morning cartoon", and noted the addition of time trials to the first two games as a welcome change that "offer[s] plenty of new challenges." Andrew Reiner of Game Informer also praised the addition of time trials, along with the ability to play as Coco and the unified autosave system; additionally, the review noted the technical feat of remastering the games "from the ground up" without the use of Naughty Dog's original source code. Jeuxvideo called the ground-up production "[a] real performance" while also praising "the nostalgia factor" and the rerecorded music.

Criticism of the game centered around aspects such as character controls and the original trilogy's pitfalls. Justin Clark of Slant criticized the trilogy as "stultifying in [its] need for absolute precision" and stated that achievements provoked "little reward". Dornbush was less critical of the level design, but noted that the first game was "easily the weakest" for its limited move set, while Ashley Oh of Polygon found some design choices "unforgiving and frustrating" and agreed that there was "no margin of error" in much of the platforming.

 Sales Crash Bandicoot N. Sane Trilogy was a commercial success, selling over 2.5 million copies in the first three months of its release, increasing to ten million by February 2019. In the United Kingdom, the N. Sane Trilogy was the best-selling game for eight consecutive weeks since its initial release. Its release also saw the biggest launch of a game in the first half of 2017, behind Tom Clancy's Ghost Recon Wildlands. It was also the second-best-selling game in its first month in the US.

 Awards 
The game won the award for "Best Remake/Remaster" at IGN's 2017 awards, while the readers and staff of Game Informer'' voted it as the "Best Remastered Action" and "Best Remastered/Remade" game in theirs. It was also nominated for the Tappan Zee Bridge Award for "Best Remake" at the New York Game Awards 2018, and won the award for "Game, Classic Revival" at the National Academy of Video Game Trade Reviewers Awards, whereas its other nomination was for the "Original Light Mix Score, Franchise" category. It was also nominated for "People's Choice" at the Italian Video Game Awards.

Notes

References

External links
 

2017 video games
3D platform games
Platform games
Activision video game compilations
Crash Bandicoot games
Nintendo Switch games
PlayStation 4 games
PlayStation 4 Pro enhanced games
Single-player video games
Trilogies
Video games featuring female protagonists
Video game remasters
Video games set on fictional islands
Video games using Havok
Vicarious Visions games
Windows games
Xbox One games
Xbox One X enhanced games
Video games with 2.5D graphics
Activision games
Video games scored by Josh Mancell
Dinosaurs in video games
Toys for Bob games
Video games developed in the United States
Iron Galaxy games